Anacanthobatis is a genus of smooth skates native to the western Indian Ocean, where found deeper than .

Species
Several species have been assigned to this genus, but most are now placed in Sinobatis, Springeria, and Schroederobatis, leaving only A. marmoratus in Anacanthobatis.
 Anacanthobatis marmoratus (von Bonde & Swart, 1923) (spotted legskate)

References

 
Anacanthobatidae
Ray genera